The Drifter is a 1932 American pre-Code drama film directed by William A. O'Connor.

Cast
William Farnum as The Drifter
Noah Beery, Sr. as John McNary
Phyllis Barrington as Bonnie McNary
Charles Sellon as Whitey
Bruce Warren as Paul LaTour
Russell Hopton as Montana
Ann Brody as Marie
Ynez Seabury as Yvonne

External links 

1932 films
American black-and-white films
1932 drama films
American drama films
1930s English-language films
1930s American films